Blue Pyramid is an album by American jazz saxophonist Johnny Hodges and organist Wild Bill Davis featuring performances recorded in late 1965 and early 1966 and released on the Verve label.

Reception

Allmusic awarded the album 3 stars with its review by Scott Yanow stating, "Although the blues feeling (as pointed out in the liner notes) is emphasized throughout the date, many of the songs, including "The Brown Skin Gal in the Calico Gown" and "Stormy Weather," are not really blues, but only bluesy. Overall this is a fine outing".

Track listing
All compositions by Johnny Hodges except where noted
 "Blues for Madeleine" – 4:48
 "Feelin' Kinda Blues" (Gerald Wilson) – 2:30
 "Pyramid" (Duke Ellington, Juan Tizol, Irving Gordon, Irving Mills) – 2:10
 "Nonchalance" (Wild Bill Davis) – 4:45
 "At Dawn" (Johnny Hodges, Thomas Whaley) – 3:00
 "The Brown-Skin Gal in the Calico Gown" (Ellington, Paul Francis Webster) – 2:35
 "Stormy Weather" (Harold Arlen, Ted Koehler) – 3:56
 "Rabbit Out of the Hat" – 5:10
 "Hash Brown" – 4:00

Personnel
Johnny Hodges – alto saxophone
Wild Bill Davis – organ (tracks 1-4 & 6-9)
Lawrence Brown- trombone
Jimmy Hamilton – clarinet (tracks 1-3, 5, 6, 8 & 9)
Jimmy Jones – piano (track 5)
Billy Butler – guitar
Bob Bushnell – bass (tracks 1-3 & 5-9)
Johnny Hodges Jr. (track 6), Herbie Lovelle (tracks 2, 3 & 5), Joe Marshall (tracks 1, 4 & 6-9) – drums

References

Johnny Hodges albums
Wild Bill Davis albums
1966 albums
Albums produced by Creed Taylor
Verve Records albums